Drop Nineteens is an American, Boston-based shoegaze band active from 1991 to 1995. They were one of the few U.S.-based bands who styled themselves on England's distinctive shoegaze sound, taking their inspiration from bands such as My Bloody Valentine, Slowdive, Th' Faith Healers, and Bleach.

The band received its name from a childhood memory of Greg Ackell who would drop things off the terrace of his apartment, where he lived on the 19th floor.

The band was formed by former classmates Greg Ackell (vocals, guitar) and Chris Roof (drums), who recruited Paula Kelley (vocals, guitar), Steve Zimmerman (bass), and Motohiro Yasue (guitar).

Overview
Much like Boston's Pixies before them, Drop Nineteens were better known in the UK, where, as an unsigned band, they first gained attention from the British music press with two 8-track demos. The band ultimately reached the UK's Indie Album and Indie Singles charts with formal releases after signing a record deal.

Signing to Caroline Records (Hut Records in the UK), Drop Nineteens immediately garnered college radio airplay with their 1992 debut album, Delaware.

Because of artistic differences, several member changes occurred between the first and second full-length releases. Kelley, Roof and Yasue went on to pursue other interests, and Megan Gilbert (vocals, guitar), Pete Koeplin (drums) and Justin Crosby (guitar) were added to the lineup in 1993.

Shortly thereafter, Drop Nineteens released their second full-length album, National Coma. Its original cover design was a photograph of a reclining nude woman, painted entirely white, wearing a white ski mask, in front of a white background. Most CD copies had a jumbled (censored) version of this photo, while LPs had the original cover. (The Japanese version of the album had two bonus tracks: "Tempest" and "Sea Rock.")

The band made three music videos, and toured on the success of their first album; they headlined/co-headlined/opened tours in England, Europe, and North America, and recorded BBC radio sessions for John Peel and Mark Goodier. They also played several music festivals including England's Reading Festival and North America's Lollapalooza. Further artistic differences ensued, however, and the band broke up for good in 1995.

In the late 1990s, Ackell and Koeplin recorded an album under the band name Fidel, which was never formally released. Kelley went on to front the bands Hot Rod and Boy Wonder, and is currently a solo artist with the Paula Kelley Orchestra.

In January 2022, Ackell announced that the Drop Nineteens had reunited and would release a new album later that year. The band's reunited lineup features Ackell, Pete Koeplin, Motohiro Yasue, and Paula Kelley.

In popular culture
The music of Drop Nineteens featured prominently in the American comedy television series The Adventures of Pete & Pete. British songwriter Owen Tromans included a song about Ackell and Drop Nineteens, entitled "Greg", on his 2013 EP For Haden.

Discography

Studio albums
Delaware (1992, Caroline/Hut/Cherry Red) 
National Coma (1993, Caroline/Hut/Virgin)

Singles and EPs
"Winona" single (1992, Hut)
Your Aquarium CD/10"/12" EP (1992, Caroline/Hut)
"Limp" 7"/12" EP (1993, Hut/Virgin; 1994, Caroline)

Demos
Mayfield (1991, self-released)

References

External links
 Official website
 
 

American shoegaze musical groups
Musical groups established in 1991
Musical groups disestablished in 1995
Musical groups reestablished in 2022
Musical groups from Boston
1991 establishments in Massachusetts